The 2009 Dublin Senior Football Championship is the inter club Gaelic football competition between the top teams in Dublin GAA.

First round
The winners of the first round progress to the second round, the losers go on to a backdoor round with a chance to progress to the second round.

Bye	V	St Peregrine's

Qualifier Round
The Backdoor round or the qualifier round features  all the teams who lost in the first round of the championship. It gives each team a second chance to progress in the championship by moving on to the third round. The losers of the backdoor games will go on to the relegation playoffs with the eventual loser moving to the Dublin Intermediate Football Championship. The teams taking part in the backdoor round are Whitehall Colmcille, St Annes, Ballyboden St Endas, Erins Isle, St Marks, Kilmacud Crokes, St Brigids, UCD, Raheny, Naomh Olaf, St Sylvesters, Trinity Gaels, Parnells, Naomh Mearnóg, Templepgue Synge Street.

Ballyboden St Enda's bye

Relegation Playoffs
The teams fighting for survival in the 2009 championship are: Whitehall Colmcille, Fingal Ravens, Templeogue Synge Street, Naomh Olaf, St Annes, Naomh Mearnóg and Fingallians.

Templeogue Synge Street go straight to the second round.

Second round

Third round
The third round will be contested by the teams that won their respective backdoor games and the teams who lost their second round games. The winners of the third round progress to the last sixteen of the Dublin football championship. The teams taking part are UCD, Clontarf, St Marks, Parnells, St Brigids, Na Fianna, Raheny, Naomh Maur, Thomas Davis, Ballyboden St Endas, Erins Isle and Ballinteer St Johns.

Last 16
Round Towers, Clondalkin, Lucan Sarsfields, Ballymun Kickhams, St Vincents, St Judes, St Oliver Plunketts/Eoghan Ruadh, O'Tooles, Kilmacud Crokes, St Brigids, Ballyboden St Endas, UCD, St Sylvesters, St Marys, Saggart, Parnells, Raheny and Peregrines are in the last 16 of the 2009 championship. The biggest upset of the round was St Mary's of Saggart's win over 2008 All-Ireland club champions St Vincents. O'Tooles, Parnells, St Brigids, Round Towers, Clondalkin, St Peregrines, St Vincents, St Sylvesters and Raheny all exited the competition at the Last 16 stage but retain their place in the Senior Championship for 2010.

Quarter finals
UCD, Kilmacud Crokes, Lucan Sarsfields, St Judes, Ballyboden St Endas, St Marys and St Oliver Plunketts/Eoghan Ruadh have qualified for the last eight the first time of asking. The game between Ballymun Kickhams and Parnells finished all level and the replay was played at Parnell Park on Wednesday September 9. Ballymun won the replay setting them up with a quarter final game against reigning champions Kilmacud Crokes. St Mary's were the first team to qualify for the semi finals of the Dublin Championship in a tight encounter with UCD. UCD, Ballymun Kickhams and Lucan Sarsfields were knocked out of the Dublin senior football championship at the quarter final stage.  Underdogs St Judes beat St Oliver Plunketts/Eoghan Ruadh by three points after a replay at Parnell Park on September 23.

Semi finals
Ballyboden St Endas, Kilmacud Crokes, St Judes and St Mary's, Saggart have qualified for the semi finals of the Dublin Senior Football Championship. All teams remaining in the competition are from South Dublin.

Dublin Senior Football Final

References

Dublin Senior Football Championship
Dublin Senior Football Championship